FC Vitebsk-2 is a Belarusian football club from Vitebsk. The club acts as a reserve team for FC Vitebsk.

History
During Soviet era the team was known as KIM-2 Vitebsk, while the main was called KIM Vitebsk. Until 1991 KIM-2 played in Belarusian SSR League. In 1992 KIM-2 was included in newly created Belarusian First League, while their parent team KIM Vitebsk joined Belarusian Premier League . In 1994 KIM was renamed to Dvina Vitebsk and their reserve team to Kimovets Vitebsk. Midway through 1996 season Kimovets withdrew from the First League and was folded, while Dvina partnered with Lokomotiv Vitebsk to use them as a farm club.

Following the relegation to First League after 2011 season, FC Vitebsk decided to give their reserve squad competitive practice by re-creating a Second League reserve team under the name Vitebsk-2, as they were ineligible for participation in Belarusian Premier League Reserves Championship. This incarnation of Vitebsk-2 was active from 2012 till 2014.

League and Сup history

External links
Official website

Defunct football clubs in Belarus
Sport in Vitebsk
FC Vitebsk
Belarusian reserve team football
1990 establishments in Belarus
2012 establishments in Belarus
1996 disestablishments in Belarus
2014 disestablishments in Belarus
Association football clubs established in 1990
Association football clubs established in 2012
Association football clubs established in 1996
Association football clubs established in 2014